Paek Se-yun, sometimes written Paek Se-yoon, is the president of North Korea's Korea Computer Company.  He has served in that capacity since 2000.  In the same year, he was awarded the Order of Kim Il-sung.  Paek has also been an alternate member of the Central Committee of the Workers' Party of Korea since 1988.  He was a delegate to the ninth Supreme People's Assembly, 1990–1998.

Works

See also
 Politics of North Korea

References
Yonhap News Agency.  "Who's who, North Korea," pp. 787–812 in 

Members of the Supreme People's Assembly
Living people
Workers' Party of Korea politicians
Recipients of the Order of Kim Il-sung
Year of birth missing (living people)